Tetraena giessii, synonym Zygophyllum giessii, is a species of plant in the family Zygophyllaceae. It is endemic to Namibia.  Its natural habitats are rocky areas and cold desert. It is threatened by habitat loss.

References

Zygophylloideae
Endemic flora of Namibia
Least concern plants
Least concern biota of Africa
Taxonomy articles created by Polbot
Taxobox binomials not recognized by IUCN